The 2022–23 season is Persib's 89th season since its foundation, 24th consecutive season in the top-flight of Indonesian football, and 14th season competing in Liga 1.

Squad information

First team squad

Pre-seasons and friendlies

Indonesia President's Cup

Group-stage

Quarter-finals

Transfers

In

Out

New contracts

Loan In

Loan Out

Competitions

Liga 1

Squad statistics

Squad appearances and goals

|-
! colspan=14 style=background:#dcdcdc; text-align:center|Goalkeepers

|-
! colspan=14 style=background:#dcdcdc; text-align:center|Defenders

|-
! colspan=14 style=background:#dcdcdc; text-align:center|Midfielders

|-
! colspan=14 style=background:#dcdcdc; text-align:center|Forwards

|-
! colspan=14 style=background:#dcdcdc; text-align:center|Players transferred or loaned out during the season the club

Top scorers

Assists

Clean sheets

Disciplinary record 
{| class="wikitable" style="text-align:center;"
|-
| rowspan="2" !width=15|
| rowspan="2"!width=15|
| rowspan="2" !width=15|
| rowspan="2" !width=120|Player
| colspan="3"|Liga 1
| colspan="3"|Total
|-
!width=34; background:#fe9;"|
!width=34; background:#fe9;"|
!width=34; background:#ff8888;"|
!width=34; background:#fe9;"|
!width=34; background:#fe9;"|
!width=34; background:#ff8888;"|
|-
|2
|DF
|
|Nick Kuipers
|0
|0
|0
|0
|0
|0
|-
|4
|DF
|
|Bayu Fiqri
|0
|0
|0
|0
|0
|0
|-
|5
|DF
|
|Kakang Rudianto
|0
|0
|0
|0
|0
|0
|-
|7
|MF
|
|Beckham Putra
|0
|0
|0
|0
|0
|0
|-
|8
|MF
|
|Abdul Aziz
|0
|0
|0
|0
|0
|0
|-
|10
|MF
|
|Marc Klok
|0
|0
|0
|0
|0
|0
|-
|11
|MF
|
|Dedi Kusnandar
|0
|0
|0
|0
|0
|0
|-
|12
|DF
|
|Henhen Herdiana
|0
|0
|0
|0
|0
|0
|-
|13
|MF
|
|Febri Hariyadi
|0
|0
|0
|0
|0
|0
|-
|14
|GK
|
|Teja Paku Alam
|0
|0
|0
|0
|0
|0
|-
|15
|MF
|
|Dimas Pamungkas
|0
|0
|0
|0
|0
|0
|-
|16
|DF
|
|Achmad Jufriyanto
|0
|0
|0
|0
|0
|0
|-
|17
|MF
|
|Ricky Kambuaya
|0
|0
|0
|0
|0
|0
|-
|18
|DF
|
|David Rumakiek
|0
|0
|0
|0
|0
|0
|-
|21
|MF
|
|Frets Butuan
|0
|0
|0
|0
|0
|0
|-
|25
|FW
|
|David da Silva
|0
|0
|0
|0
|0
|0
|-
|27
|DF
|
|Zalnando
|0
|0
|0
|0
|0
|0
|-
|30
|FW
|
|Ezra Walian
|0
|0
|0
|0
|0
|0
|-
|32
|DF
|
|Victor Igbonefo
|0
|0
|0
|0
|0
|0
|-
|33
|DF
|
|Rachmat Irianto
|0
|0
|0
|0
|0
|0
|-
|77
|MF
|
|Ciro Alves
|0
|0
|0
|0
|0
|0
|-
|78
|GK
|
|I Made Wirawan
|0
|0
|0
|0
|0
|0
|-
|88
|MF
|
|Syafril Lestaluhu
|0
|0
|0
|0
|0
|0
|-
|93
|MF
|
|Erwin Ramdani
|0
|0
|0
|0
|0
|0
|-
|
|MF
|
|Ferdiansyah
|0
|0
|0
|0
|0
|0
|-
|
|MF
|
|Agung Mulyadi
|0
|0
|0
|0
|0
|0
|-
|
|GK
|
|Fitrul Dwi Rustapa
|0
|0
|0
|0
|0
|0
|-
|
|DF
|
|Eriyanto
|0
|0
|0
|0
|0
|0
|-
|
|MF
|
|Arsan Makarin
|0
|0
|0
|0
|0
|0

References

External links 
 Persib Bandung Official website

Persib Bandung seasons
Persib Bandung